Nesna is a municipality in Nordland county, Norway. It is part of the Helgeland traditional region. The administrative centre of the municipality is the village of Nesna. Other villages in Nesna include Handnesneset, Husby, Saura, and Vikholmen.

The municipality consists of the three islands Tomma, Hugla (known as "Hugløy" by its inhabitants), and Handnesøya, and one peninsula that bears the name of the municipality, Nesna. The old Husby Estate is headquartered in Husby on Tomma island.
 
The Coastal Express arrives two times a day at the village of Nesna, the northbound arrives 05:30 and the southbound 11:15. The village of Nesna is also home to Nordland's education center Nesna University College, and there is also the KVN High School, and Nesna Church.

The  municipality is the 309th largest by area out of the 356 municipalities in Norway. Nesna is the 296th most populous municipality in Norway with a population of 1,698.

General information

Nesna was established as a municipality on 1 January 1838 (see formannskapsdistrikt law). The western island district of Nesna (population: 1,348) was separated from Nesna on 1 July 1888 to form the new municipality of Dønnes. This left Nesna with 2,958 residents. On 1 January 1919, the Bardalssjøen farm (population: 4) was transferred from Hemnes Municipality to Nesna Municipality. In 1945, a small area of southern Nesna (population: 26) was transferred to Leirfjord Municipality.

During the 1960s, there were many municipal mergers across Norway due to the work of the Schei Committee. On 1 January 1962, part of the island of Løkta (population: 80) was transferred from Nesna to the new Dønna Municipality and part of the island of Tomma (population: 80) was transferred from the old municipality of Dønnes to Nesna Municipality. Then on 1 January 1964, the Bardalssjøen area of Nesna, located south of the Ranfjorden, was transferred to Leirfjord Municipality. On that same date, the part of Nesna around the inner part of the Sjona fjord was transferred to Rana Municipality.

Name
The municipality (originally the parish) is named after the old Nesna farm since the first Nesna Church was built there. The name is derived from the word  which means "headland". The name was historically spelled Nesne.

Coat of arms
The coat of arms was granted on 23 June 1989. The official blazon is "Per chevron inverted Or and Azure". This means the arms have a field (background) that is divided by a line in the form of an inverted chevron pattern. The background above the line has a tincture of Or which means it is commonly colored yellow, but if it is made out of metal, then gold is used. The background below the line has a tincture of azure. The arms are a canting of the name of the municipality (Nesna comes form nes which means headland in Norwegian). The arms show a yellow-colored "headland" or peninsula surrounded by blue water. The arms were designed by Jarle E. Henriksen.

Churches

The Church of Norway has one parish within the municipality of Nesna. It is part of the Nord-Helgeland prosti (deanery) in the Diocese of Sør-Hålogaland.

Government
All municipalities in Norway, including Nesna, are responsible for primary education (through 10th grade), outpatient health services, senior citizen services, unemployment and other social services, zoning, economic development, and municipal roads. The municipality is governed by a municipal council of elected representatives, which in turn elect a mayor. The municipality falls under the Rana District Court and the Hålogaland Court of Appeal.

Municipal council
The municipal council of Nesna is made up of 17 representatives that are elected to four-year terms. The party breakdown of the council is as follows:

Mayors
The mayors of Nesna:

 1838–1848: Johan Augustinussen
 1848–1850: Fredrik Christian Sand
 1850–1854: Johan Augustinussen
 1854–1867: Elias Olsen 	
 1867–1876: Jacob Fredrik Zahl
 1877–1880: Elias Olsen
 1881–1890: Carl Jøsevold
 1891–1894: Jakob Beck
 1894–1896: Lorents Pettersen
 1896–1898: Christian F. Olsen
 1899–1907: Carl Jøsevold
 1908–1914: Nils Haugen
 1915–1918: Anders Pettersen
 1919–1922: Møller Zahl Hauknes
 1922–1925: Ivar Hjellvik
 1926–1928: Laurits Riise
 1929–1942: Arne Langset (V)
 1943–1945: Anders Forsland
 1945-1945: Arne Langset (V)
 1946–1952: Johan Knutsen (Ap)
 1952–1956: Einar Enga (Ap)
 1956–1957: Olaus Berg (H)
 1958–1964: Edvard Kaspersen (Ap)
 1964-1964: Henry Antonsen (Ap)
 1964–1965: Håkon Langseth (Sp)
 1966–1967: Leander Paulsen (Ap)
 1968–1971: Arne Herseth (Ap)
 1972–1973: Edvard Kaspersen (LL)
 1974–1975: Arne Herseth (Ap)
 1976–1981: Mathias Sellæg Moe (V)
 1982–1983: Kåre Eriksen (H)
 1984–1985: Ole A. Selseth (V)
 1986–1987: Arne Herseth (Ap)
 1988–1991: Øyvind Jenssen (Ap)
 1991–1995: Anne-Lise Wold (Ap)
 1996–1999: Gunnhild Forsland (Sp)
 1999–2007: Anne-Lise Wold (Ap)
 2007-2011: Ronny Sommerro (Ap)
 2011-2015: Marit Bye (H)
 2015-present: Hanne Davidsen (Ap)

Notable residents
 Johan Augustinussen (born 1808 at Langset - 1888 in Nesna), a curate/choirmaster, teacher, and politician
 Hans Christiansen (1867 in Nesna – 1938), a sailor who competed at the 1912 Summer Olympics 
 Birger Fredrik Motzfeldt OBE, CVO (1898 in Nesna – 1987), a Norwegian aviator and senior military officer.
 Ida Maria (born 1984), a Norwegian musician and singer-songwriter; born and lives in Nesna
 Emil Weber Meek (born 1988), a Norwegian professional mixed martial artist, brought up in Nesna
 Ulrik Berglann (born 1992 in Nesna), a Norwegian footballer with 180 club caps

References

External links
Municipal fact sheet from Statistics Norway 

Official site of Nesna Municipality
Hammerø nature reserve
Dillern-Ørnes nature reserve at Handnesøya
Husbymarka nature reserve at Tomma

 
Municipalities of Nordland
1838 establishments in Norway